Tracy Ip Chui Chui (born 10 September 1981 in Hong Kong with family roots in Shanghai) was Miss Hong Kong 2005.

Background
Coming from a family of four, Ip lives with her parents. Her mother wanted to compete at Miss Hong Kong but due to her father's marriage, she gave up. Ip grew up in Hong Kong and studied at King Edward's School, Witley for a few years. In the early 2000s, she returned to Hong Kong and entered the Hong Kong Polytechnic University, majoring in fashion design. She was also a part-time model with the Elite, modelling in some shows and commercials. She entered the Elite Look of the Year (HK) 2001 contest, making the top 24 but did not win anything in the end. In 2005 she competed in the 2005 Miss Hong Kong competition.

Miss Hong Kong 2005
Ip was trained with 19 other delegates for three months. She visited the Tsunami affected areas like Sri Lanka and Thailand during her training. After that, on 20 August 2005, she competed at the HK Colliseum for the Miss Hong Kong 2005 crown. Even though she had negative news regarding surgery on her nose, she had a flawless performance and took the crown. She also received the title of Miss Charity. After that, she hosted some shows and performed in many charity shows in Hong Kong.

Miss World 2005
Being considered a good representative for Hong Kong, Ip competed in Sanya, China for the Miss World 2005 title. She started out well for having some common "features" of former Miss World semi-finalists from Hong Kong (like Maggie Cheung of 1983 and Pauline Yeung of 1987, all had lived/studied in England). She placed seventh in the Asia Pacific team and was close to winning the fast track event, Beauty with a Purpose. Ip also made the top 19 of the Beach Beauty Contest, which stunned many pageant fans. Ip also sold 35,000 RMB for her globe that was donated and auctioned at a charity dinner. It was the item that raised the most money that night. She returned to Hong Kong on 10 December.

Miss Chinese International 2006
On 28 December 2005, Ip attended a press conference for the Miss Chinese International 2006 pageant. Being a favourite from the start, Ip was expected to place in the top 3, and might even take the crown.  Surprisingly, Ip was shut out of the top 5 of the pageant. She only received a side award as a consolation. She is only one a few Miss Hong Kong winners to not make the top 5 in the history of the pageant.

Personal
Tracy Ip is married to Raymond Chow.  The couple delivered their first child, a baby boy on 11 April 2017.

Afterwards
Ip afterwards hosted TVB shows like EBuzz. She also signed a contract with TVB to start in some dramas. On 12 August 2006, she gave her crown and duties to Aimee Chan Yan Mei, Miss Hong Kong 2006. She also presented an award to Mr. Hong Kong 2006, Francois Huynh (Wong Cheung Fat) as he was the Handsome Group winner.

Filmography

Television

Film

External links
Official TVB blog of Tracy Ip
Miss Hong Kong 2005 profile
Miss Chinese International 2006 profile

1981 births
Alumni of the Hong Kong Polytechnic University
Living people
Hong Kong film actresses
Hong Kong television actresses
Miss Hong Kong winners
Miss World 2005 delegates
People educated at King Edward's School, Witley
TVB actors
21st-century Hong Kong actresses